Julia Aquilia Severa (d. after 222) was the second and fourth wife of Roman emperor Elagabalus. She was the daughter of Quintus Aquilius. The praenomen of "Julia" was given to her after becoming an empress.

Life
Severa was a Vestal Virgin and, as such, her marriage to Elagabalus in late 220 was the cause of enormous controversy – traditionally, the punishment for breaking the thirty-year vow of celibacy was death by being buried alive.  Elagabalus is believed to have had religious reasons for marrying Severa – he himself was a follower of the eastern sun god El-Gabal, and when marrying himself to Severa, he also conducted a symbolic marriage of his god to Vesta.

Both these marriages were revoked shortly afterwards, however. This was possibly on the urging of Julia Maesa, the grandmother who had engineered Elagabalus' rise to the imperial throne. Elagabalus then married Annia Faustina, a more generally acceptable choice to the senatorial elite. Within a short time, however, Elagabalus had divorced Faustina and returned to living with Severa, claiming that the original divorce was invalid. It is believed that Severa remained with Elagabalus until his assassination in 222. The two are not believed to have had any children.

Severa's own opinions about the entire affair are not very well recorded. Some sources state that she was forced to marry against her will, and others go further, alleging rape. It is claimed by some historians, however, that many stories about Elagabalus have been exaggerated by his enemies, and so there is no certainty about what actually happened. It is unclear whether Elagabalus had any real feelings towards Severa, or whether he was more concerned with the symbolism of the marriage. Elagabalus also had relationships with men, and the historian Cassius Dio claims that Elagabalus had a more stable relationship with his chariot driver, Hierocles, than with any of his wives.

Her fate after Elagabalus's assassination is unknown.

Severan dynasty family tree

See also
 Women in ancient Rome

Notes

Severan dynasty
Vestal Virgins
Aquillii
3rd-century clergy
3rd-century Roman empresses
Priestesses of the Roman Empire
Wives of Elagabalus
Augustae